Anthony Ellul (born August 1966) is a Maltese judge. He is a graduate of the University of Malta.

See also
 Judiciary of Malta

References

Living people
20th-century Maltese judges
21st-century Maltese judges
1966 births
People from Floriana
University of Malta alumni
Date of birth missing (living people)